Lodwar Airport is an airport in Kenya.

Location
Lodwar Airport  is located in Turkana County, in the town of Lodwar, in the northwestern part of the Republic of Kenya.

Overview
Lodwar  Airport is a civilian airport that serves the town of Lodwar and surrounding communities. 

Airlines and destinations

See also
 Kenya Airports Authority
 Kenya Civil Aviation Authority
 List of airports in Kenya

References

External links
  Location of Lodwar Airport At Google Maps
  Website of Kenya Airports Authority
 

Airports in Kenya
Airports in Rift Valley Province
Turkana County